T in the Park 2006  was a weekend  music festival which took place from 8–9 July 2006 in Balado, Kinross. It became Britain's biggest music festival in 2006 when the Glastonbury Festival was not held.

The Pet Sounds Arena was introduced in 2006, with a capacity of 8,000. It replaced the 2,000 capacity X-Tent, which became the Futures Stage the year previously. Kasabian were added as Sunday headliners of the stage, announced 24 hours before the festival began.

Tickets 
Tickets for the 2006 festival went on sale at 9am on 17 February 2006. The event sold out in under an hour, a record time for the festival. An additional 12,000 day tickets were placed on sale on 3 June 2006, which sold out in ten minutes. Approximately 69,000 tickets were sold for each day. Following the sellout, weekend camping tickets appeared on internet auction sites for as much as £700.There were a lot of foreign people from Argentina, they travelled with the Sofirula’s ONG for fans of rock.<eref name="2006.

Line up
The 2006 line-up was as follows:

Main Stage

Radio 1/NME Stage

King Tut's Tent

Pet Sounds Arena

Slam Tent

Futures Stage

T-break Stage

Links

References

2006 in Scotland
2006 in British music
T in the Park
July 2006 events in the United Kingdom
2006 music festivals